An administrative subpoena under U.S. law is a subpoena issued by a federal agency without prior judicial oversight.  Critics say that administrative subpoena authority is a violation of the Fourth Amendment to the United States Constitution, while proponents say that it provides a valuable investigative tool.

History

Philip Hamburger argues historical antecedents for the modern-day administrative subpoena date back as far as the Star Chamber and the prerogative courts, which issued warrants and subpoenas that were not subject to significant procedural safeguards or the rule of law.

Administrative subpoenas have most commonly been issued by the Offices of the Inspector General of various federal agencies.  The Drug Enforcement Administration was granted administrative subpoena authority under the Comprehensive Drug Abuse Prevention and Control Act of 1970.  In 1996 Congress expanded the authority to issue the subpoenas to the Federal Bureau of Investigation when investigating health care fraud cases under the Health Insurance Portability and Accountability Act.  More recently, Public law 106-544 December 19, 2000 the Department of Justice has attempted to expand administrative subpoena authority to terrorism investigations through amendments to the Patriot Act.

The United States Department of the Treasury's Office of Foreign Assets Control (OFAC) also frequently utilizes administrative subpoenas to initiate civil investigations of U.S. economic sanctions violations. OFAC subpoenas are typically to be responded to in 30 days and require the subpoenaed party to turn over full and complete information, as well as, supporting documentation to verify the information provided in the response.

Legal background 
Courts typically exercise substantial deference to the agency requesting the subpoena in deciding whether to enforce it. The decision of a district court to enforce an administrative subpoena is reviewed for abuse of discretion, itself a deferential standard.

See also
 National security letter

References

Sources

References 

Legal documents
United States administrative law
Patriot Act